Dušan Maravić (Serbian Cyrillic: Душан Маравић; born 7 March 1939) is a Serbian former midfielder who played for SFR Yugoslavia. He was part of the Yugoslav squad that won gold at the 1960 Summer Olympics.

Early life and playing career
Born in France, as his father were working in Injoux-Génissiat, a small village close to Swiss border. After the Second World War his family moved back to Yugoslavia, settling in Bajmok, a village close to Subotica.

His first football steps were taken in local club Radnički Bajmok when Maravić was six years old, ten years later he joined the more famous Spartak Subotica. In 1958, aged 19 he became a member of Yugoslavian giants Red Star Belgrade. In six years with Red Star, Maravić appeared in 232 official matches, scoring 82 goals.

Attacking midfielder has also member of Yugoslavia national football team player in 7 occasiones, and scored 3 goals. Thanks to being member of gold Olympic medal squad, he was allowed to go abroad before national propositions limit of 28. Hence, he became a member of Racing Paris aged 25. He played for "The Penguins" until 1969 when he shortly moved to OFK Beograd, and then proceed to Venezuelan Deportivo Italia.

Post playing career
After retiring as a player, he has spent some time coaching and also working in national football union administration, which led him to become an employee of UEFA and FIFA as an international instructor and delegate. He was nominated to run for FIFA president.

Personal
He is fluent in: French, English, Spanish and Italian language. Simultaneously with his sporting career, Maravić has pursued studies, finishing University of Belgrade Faculty of Economics. He has sons Antoni and Alfredo, the latter works as a sports agent.

References

External links
Profile on Serbian federation site
Interview at "Politika"

1939 births
Living people
French footballers
French people of Serbian descent
Serbian footballers
Serbian expatriate footballers
Yugoslav footballers
Yugoslav expatriate footballers
Yugoslavia international footballers
Expatriate footballers in France
Expatriate footballers in Venezuela
Association football midfielders
Deportivo Italia players
University of Belgrade Faculty of Economics alumni
FK Spartak Subotica players
Red Star Belgrade footballers
Yugoslav First League players
Ligue 2 players
Racing Club de France Football players
Footballers at the 1960 Summer Olympics
Olympic footballers of Yugoslavia
Olympic gold medalists for Yugoslavia
Olympic medalists in football
FIFA officials
Medalists at the 1960 Summer Olympics